This page lists the city flags of Adygea, Russia. It is a part of the List of city flags of Russia, which is split into federal subjects due to its size.

Cities and towns

Rural localities

References